Hals is a German and Dutch surname, originally a nickname for someone with a long neck or a sufferer of goitres. Notable people with surname include:

Dirck Hals (1591–1656), Dutch painter
Frans Hals (c.1582–1666), Dutch painter
William Hals (1655–1737), British historian

References

Dutch-language surnames
German-language surnames